Daniel Garcia is an American professional wrestler signed to All Elite Wrestling (AEW), where he is a member of the Jericho Appreciation Society stable. He also appears for AEW's sister promotion Ring of Honor (ROH), where he a one-time ROH Pure Champion. As part of Pro Wrestling Guerrilla (PWG), he is the current PWG World Champion in his first reign.

Career

Early career and independent circuit (2018–present)
Garcia began competing for Limitless Wrestling in 2018. He appeared for WWE on an episode of 205 Live in July 2018, during which he lost against Drew Gulak. In January 2021, he competed against Tyler Rust in WWE on NXT, where he lost. Garcia won the Limitless World Championship in March. He lost the title to Anthony Greene in September. In January 2022, he competed in Pro Wrestling Guerrilla (PWG)'s Battle of Los Angeles and eventually won the tournament by defeating Mike Bailey in the final round. In May 2022, he won the PWG World Championship by defeating Bandido.

All Elite Wrestling and Ring of Honor (2021–present)
Garcia made his debut in All Elite Wrestling (AEW) in September 2020 during an episode of Dark. He was announced as having signed with AEW in October 2021. In a March 2022 episode of Dynamite, Garcia alongside Jeff Parker and Matt Lee formed a stable with Chris Jericho and Jake Hager called the Jericho Appreciation Society. In September 2022 on Dynamite, Garcia defeated Wheeler Yuta to win the ROH Pure Championship. Garcia lost the title back to Yuta at Final Battle, ending his reign at 94 days.

Personal life
Garcia was trained in professional wrestling by Brandon Thurston and The Blade.

In January 2019, Garcia broke both of his legs in a car crash involving three other wrestlers. The vehicle he was riding in crashed after hitting black ice. Garcia returned to wrestling six months later. The following year, he graduated from Buffalo State College with a communications degree.

Championships and accomplishments
 Capital City Championship Combat
 C4 Championship (1 time)
 Empire State Wrestling
 ESW Heavyweight Championship (1 time)
 Limitless Wrestling
 Limitless World Championship (1 time)
 Pro Wrestling Guerrilla
 PWG World Championship (1 time, current)
 Battle of Los Angeles (2022)
 Pro Wrestling Illustrated
 Ranked No. 233 of the top 500 male singles wrestlers in the PWI 500 in 2021
 Ring of Honor
 ROH Pure Championship (1 time)

References

External links
 
 
 

Living people
All Elite Wrestling personnel
American male professional wrestlers
Year of birth missing (living people)
Buffalo State College alumni
Sportspeople from Buffalo, New York
Professional wrestlers from New York (state)
Jericho Appreciation Society members
21st-century professional wrestlers
PWG World Champions
ROH Pure Champions